The All Assam Chess Association is a registered (under the Societies Registration Act: XXI of 1860, Number 1347 of 1981-82) chess association of the Assam state of India. It was formed in the late 1960s by Bodiyuz Zaman from Jorhat. The first president of the association was Kamakhya Prasad Tripathi. It is affiliated with the All India Chess Federation and officially accredited by the Fédération Internationale des Échecs, (FIDE).

Affiliates
Till date AACA has managed to establish district affiliates in each of Assam's districts. It has no less than 14 Districts out of a possible 23 districts, as well as various chess organizations under its affiliation. The district affiliates and organizations are even able to send players to participate regularly in National and International chess tournaments and events. Here is a list of the affiliated units: 
Barpeta District Chess Association
Cachar District Chess Association
Dibrugarh District Chess Association
Duliajan Chess Academy, Duliajan Club
Gauhati Town Club Chess Foundation
Golaghat District Chess Association
Guwahati Chess Association
Hailakandi District Chess Association
Hojai District Chess Association
Jorhat District Chess Association
Kaliabor District Chess Association
Kamrup District (Rural) Chess Association
Karimganj District. Chess Association
Kokrajhar District Chess Association
Mangaldoi District Chess Association
Morigaon District Chess Association
Nagaon District Chess association
North Lakhimpur District Chess Association
Oil India Ltd., Duliajan
P. C. Borooah Chess Academy
Sivasagar District Chess Association
Tezpur District Chess Association
Tinsukia District Chess Association

Events
From 1 to 7 July 2003, the AACA, with the help of the Alekhine Chess Club of Calcutta, organized the Telegraph chess championship at the Netaji Vidyapith Railway Higher Secondary School in Maligaon. The event was the fourth Guwahati edition of The Telegraph School Chess Championship.

References

Chess organizations
Chess in India
Sport in Assam
1960 establishments in Assam
Organisations based in Assam